Kadhum Auda Lazim (born 7 May 1966) is an Iraqi football referee who has been a full international referee for FIFA.

He also refereed at the regional league such as 2014 FIFA World Cup qualifiers.

References 

1966 births
Living people
Iraqi football referees